Leiro is a surname. Notable people with the surname include:

 Lars Leiro (1914–2005), Norwegian politician
 Sverre Leiro (born 1947), Norwegian businessman
 Vanesa Gabriela Leiro (born 1992), Argentine actress and singer

See also
 Leino